Dueto Las Voces del Rancho is a Norteño band. It is a duo whose members are Edgar Rodriguez and Mariano Fernandez. They play many traditional song styles, but with a uniquely contemporary style.

History
Dueto Las Voces del Rancho was founded in 2000 in Los Angeles, California. It all began with two young Mexican Americans: Edgar Rodriguez, born in Guadalajara, Jalisco; and Mariano Fernandez, from Los Mochis, Sinaloa. Both of them were raised in the city of Bell, a city in the Los Angeles metropolitan area. With the help of Lupillo Rivera, a well-known Regional Mexican singer, they set up a band and began recording their first songs.

"Se Les Pelo Baltazar" and "Los Dos Amigos" were Rodriguez's and Fernandez's first hit singles. Soon, their popularity increased dramatically as their songs were played extensively on Regional Mexican radio. Los Dueto Voces del Rancho released other albums and songs, including the hits "El Lunar," "Donde Están," and "De un Rancho a Otro".

Besides primarily being a Norteño band, Voces del Rancho have also played their songs with Regional Mexican artists of other subgenres, such as Banda.

See also

External links
Official Dueto Voces del Rancho website

https://iconosmagazine.net/?page_id=292

https://www.allmusic.com/artist/edgar-rodriguez-mn0002533186

https://www.billboard.com/pro/fuerza-regida-adicto-top-latin-albums-chart/

Official biography from Sony
Chalino.com: Voces del Rancho Fan website

American norteño musicians
Norteño music groups
Musical groups from Los Angeles
EMI Latin artists